Adan Villalvazo is a retired American soccer forward.

In 1995, Villalvazo played for the amateur Cerritos Inter-America.  In February 1996, the Los Angeles Galaxy selected Villalvazo in the 12th round (114th overall) of the 1996 MLS Inaugural Player Draft.  The Galaxy released him on March 26, 1996.  In 1997, he spent the season with the Orange County Zodiac of the USISL A-League.

References

Living people
American soccer players
Orange County Blue Star players
USISL players
Association football forwards
Year of birth missing (living people)